The 2016 European Tour was the eighth edition of the Race to Dubai and the 45th season of golf tournaments since the European Tour officially began in 1972.

The Race to Dubai was won for the second time by Sweden's Henrik Stenson, who was also named Golfer of the Year. The Sir Henry Cotton Rookie of the Year was Wang Jeung-hun from South Korea.

Rule changes
For the 2016 season, the European Tour modified its membership requirements from 13 tournaments inclusive of the four majors and four World Golf Championships, to 5 tournaments exclusive of them; the change was intended to make it easier for United States-based players outside the top-50 in the world rankings to retain their membership, as they may not be eligible for the majors and WGCs.

Changes for 2016
There were many changes from the previous season. Seven tournaments were lost from the schedule, the most significant being the WGC-Bridgestone Invitational which, due to a clash of dates with the 100th edition of the Open de France, was not sanctioned by the European tour in 2016. Other tournaments to be removed were the Africa Open, the Malaysian Open, the Madeira Islands Open, the Russian Open, the BMW Masters and the Hong Kong Open, which would take place early in the 2017 season due to a change in dates from October to December. There were four additions to the schedule: the return of the Perth International, the first European Tour sanctioned Australian PGA Championship; the inaugural Maybank Championship, which replaced the Malaysian Open; and the Olympic Men's Golf Competition. 

The Final Series was also adjusted; the Nedbank Golf Challenge replaced the dropped BMW Masters, and the series was reduced to three events with the removal of the WGC-HSBC Champions. As a result of the change of dates, the Nedbank Golf Challenge was played twice during the season.

The Fiji International and the King's Cup were added to the schedule later.

Schedule
The following table lists official events during the 2016 season.

Unofficial events
The following events were sanctioned by the European Tour, but did not carry official money, nor were wins official.

Location of tournaments

Race to Dubai
Since 2009, the European Tour's money list has been known as the "Race to Dubai". It is based on money earned during the season and is calculated in euro, with earnings from tournaments that award prize money in other currencies being converted at the exchange rate available the week of the event.

Final standings
Final top 10 players in the Race to Dubai:

• Did not play

Awards

Golfer of the Month

See also
2015 in golf
2016 in golf
2016 Challenge Tour
2016 European Senior Tour
2016 PGA Tour

Notes

References

European Tour seasons
European Tour